KWQC-TV (channel 6) is a television station licensed to Davenport, Iowa, United States, serving the Quad Cities area as an affiliate of NBC. Owned by Gray Television, the station maintains studios on Brady Street in downtown Davenport, and its transmitter is located near Orion, Illinois.

History
KWQC first signed on the air on October 31, 1949, as WOC-TV. The station was founded by B. J. Palmer, founder of the Palmer College of Chiropractic (located directly across the street from the station's studios) along with WOC radio (1420 AM and 103.7 FM, now WLLR-FM). The WOC stations were also sister stations to WHO-AM/FM/TV in Des Moines. According to local legend, the WOC calls stood for "Wonders of Chiropractic", though the Palmer family never acknowledged the phrase in print or otherwise. WOC-TV has the distinction of being considered both Iowa's and the Quad Cities' first television station, carrying programming from all four networks at the time: (NBC, CBS, ABC and DuMont). However, it has always been a primary NBC affiliate owing to WOC radio's long-standing affiliation with the NBC Radio Network. Originally on channel 5, WOC-TV moved to channel 6 in 1952 because of interference with both Iowa State University's WOI-TV in Ames, and WNBQ-TV (now WMAQ-TV) in Chicago. During its early years, original programming on WOC-TV included the daily Show Boat children's show hosted by Cap'n Ernie from 1964 to 1974.

WOC-TV lost CBS when Rock Island–based WHBF-TV (channel 4) was launched in 1950. The two stations shared ABC until WQAD-TV (channel 8) signed on from Moline in 1963, and has since served as an exclusive NBC station. The station was also affiliated with the short-lived Paramount Television Network; in fact, it was one of that network's strongest affiliates, carrying programs such as Dixie Showboat, Hollywood Reel, and Hollywood Wrestling.

Channel 6 remained with the Palmer family's broadcasting division after Dr. Palmer's death in 1961. In 1986, Palmer Communications sold its Quad Cities radio properties to Vickie Anne Palmer and her then-husband J. Douglas Miller. Due to Federal Communications Commission (FCC) rules at the time, channel 6 changed its calls to the current  KWQC-TV on December 8 so as not to confuse the two properties. KWQC was sold to Broad Street Television in 1989 and to Young Broadcasting in 1995.

On June 6, 2013, Media General announced they would acquire Young Broadcasting in an all-stock deal. The merger was completed on November 12. The addition of KWQC to Media General's portfolio marked a return to Iowa for Media General, who had owned KIMT in Mason City from 2000 to 2006, though they would regain ownership of that station upon acquiring LIN Media in 2014. In September 2015, Media General announced the acquisition of Meredith Corporation in a cash and stock deal valued at $2.4 billion. If the deal was completed, KWQC and KIMT would have become Meredith's first television stations in its home state of Iowa.

Media General announced on January 27, 2016, that it was terminating the Meredith deal, and also announced that it was being acquired by Nexstar Broadcasting Group with the new company named Nexstar Media Group. As Nexstar already owns WHBF-TV, and since both WHBF and KWQC rank among the top four stations by daily ratings in the market, in order to comply with FCC ownership rules as well as planned changes to rules regarding same-market television stations which would prohibit future joint sales agreements, the company was required to sell either KWQC or WHBF to another company. WHBF's sister station KGCW was not affected, and could have either remained in its duopoly with WHBF or created a new duopoly with KWQC, as its ratings are below the top-four threshold. On June 3, 2016, it was announced that Nexstar would keep its existing assets and sell KWQC to Gray Television for $270 million. It represents a reunion of sorts as Gray previously managed the station when Young was encountering financial difficulties, but this time Gray acquired the station outright. That makes KWQC a sister station to KCRG-TV in Cedar Rapids, WIFR in Rockford and fellow NBC affiliate WMTV in Madison. The sale was completed on January 17, 2017.

On February 1, 2021, Gray Television announced its intent to purchase Quincy, Illinois–based Quincy Media for $925 million. The deal was completed on August 2, 2021, placing KWQC under common ownership with fellow NBC affiliates in several Illinois and Iowa markets, including WEEK-TV in Peoria, KTIV in Sioux City, KTTC in Rochester, Minnesota–Mason City, and WGEM-TV in Quincy (the long-time flagship television station of Quincy Media). Only KWWL in Waterloo–Cedar Rapids needed to be divested to a third party, as Gray Television already owns that market's ABC affiliate KCRG-TV, and had elected to keep KCRG-TV and sell KWWL due to the ownership conflict in that market. On April 29, Gray announced that it would divest KWWL, along with fellow NBC affiliate and Quincy Media sister station WREX in Rockford, to Allen Media Broadcasting, a subsidiary of Los Angeles based Entertainment Studios, for $380 million. WREX's divestiture was optional as FCC regulations would permit common ownership of WREX and WIFR-LD as WIFR-LD is a low-power station but the sale of KWWL was required as KWWL and KCRG-TV are both full-power stations.

Subchannel history

KWQC-DT2
KWQC-DT2 is the Ion Television–affiliated second digital subchannel of KWQC-TV, broadcasting in standard definition on channel 6.2.

On August 13, 2007, KWQC launched a local digital weather service called the "KWQC 24/7 Weather Channel" on over-the-air digital subchannel 6.2 and on Mediacom digital channel 247 in the Quad Cities and surrounding areas.  The subchannel's display was similar in format to Young Broadcasting's other digital weather subchannel offerings on sister stations WBAY-TV and WTEN: Radar feeds from the station's computer system, local weather conditions (also from the computers) on the right side of the screen, a seven-day forecast below the radio/video window, and a news ticker at the bottom of the screen. Forecasts and weather maps were played on a 10-minute loop, with public service announcements and some local advertising a part of the subchannel. Per FCC guidelines requiring three hours of E/I programming per week on digital subchannels, KWQC-DT2 ran children's oriented programming Mondays thru Saturdays at 5:00 p.m. The subchannel also featured same-day rebroadcasts of Paula Sands Live at 7:00 p.m. Subchannel 6.2 initially broadcast programming in a 4:3 aspect ratio before converting to a 16:9 widescreen format (to match that of modern widescreen television receivers) in Fall 2011.

On November 1, 2015, the KWQC 24/7 Weather Channel was discontinued and replaced with entertainment programming from Ion Television. The switch made KWQC the earliest of several Media General-owned stations to affiliate a subchannel with Ion in markets where Ion does not have an owned-and-operated station. KWQC also moved subchannel 6.2 back to its original 4:3 aspect ratio. Ion Television programming and network promos are seen in a 16:9 letterbox while commercials and infomercials are center-cut to match the 4:3 aspect ratio of the subchannel.

KWQC-DT3
KWQC-DT3 is the Cozi TV–affiliated third digital subchannel of KWQC-TV, broadcasting in 16:9 widescreen standard definition on UHF channel 6.3.

In June 2013, KWQC began testing a third digital subchannel (6.3) with an ID still. The still was replaced on Labor Day of that year with programming from NBCUniversal-owned classic television network Cozi TV. The channel is also available on Mediacom cable channel 106.

Heroes & Icons (6.4) and Start TV (6.5)
On February 1, 2019, the station added Weigel Broadcasting's Heroes & Icons and Start TV to their subchannel lineup on channels 6.4 and 6.5, respectively.

Programming
In January 2008, KWQC began broadcasting syndicated programs, and NBC network programs in high definition. The first two programs aired in the format, Jeopardy! and Wheel of Fortune, are recorded and broadcast in high definition every weekday. The Saturday evening reruns of Wheel of Fortune are also broadcast in high definition. KWQC's local programs soon followed, converting their broadcasts to HD on October 27, 2010.

The station also produces a half-hour daytime talk/discussion program called Paula Sands Live at 3:00 p.m. weekdays. Hosted by weeknight 6:00 p.m. news anchor Paula Sands, the program focuses on current events in the Quad Cities area, along with a variety of other segments.

On December 2, 2020, KWQC chose not to air a rare Wednesday late afternoon Baltimore Ravens vs. Pittsburgh Steelers game, which had been originally been a Thanksgiving night matchup for NBC Sunday Night Football that was postponed three times in one week due to COVID-19 issues. Instead, Sands' daytime show and local newscasts aired as usual, with the station justifying the decision to provide local news and a platform for local businesses during the pandemic that would have been delayed due to a game without any overall regional interest.

News operation
KWQC is known by Quad Cities residents for the Highlight Zone, an Emmy award-winning Friday night sports segment (which airs during the station's 10:00 p.m. newscast from roughly late August through early March, with a break in December), showcasing highlights from area high school football and basketball games. The segment debuted in 1989, and its format has since been copied by many stations around the United States. Each member of the news anchor staff, along with the meteorologist who does weather forecasts on that particular evening, take turns recapping a featured game. The camera crews invite fans from each of the games they cover to participate in a skit related to the night's theme. The theme usually centers on a holiday (e.g., Valentine's Day) or local promotion (e.g., The Student Food Drive, an initiative by area high schools to collect food for the needy).

On July 31, 2007, KWQC debuted drastic changes to its graphics and newscast music, dumping Frank Gari's "Hello News" package that had been in use since 1990. KWQC added a "cube" ID graphic (similar to the on-screen logo bug used by Fox News Channel), which stirred up some controversy among viewers. Eventually, KWQC slowed the cube down as a result of a vote by nearly 2,000 people on its website. KWQC began using "U-Phonix", a syndicated music package composed by Stephen Arnold Music. Just eight weeks later on September 24, KWQC switched back to the "Hello News" package, making KWQC the first station to use a syndicated music package for the least amount of time. KWQC was the only station that continued to use the original "Hello News" package, but on January 16, 2012, it was dropped once again and was replaced by "Breakthrough" by 360 Music as the music package for its newscasts.

On September 25, 2008, KWQC introduced a new graphics package during its 5:00 p.m. broadcast, which also brought significant changes to its weather forecast presentation. The station introduced a new graphics system that allows the First Alert Weather team to provide more interactive weather forecasts and severe weather coverage, through animation, touch-movement and wireless transition of graphics. KWQC also introduced a revised station logo, the first change to its on-air logo since 1990. While it was similar to the one previously used, the "-TV" suffix was replaced with a "-DT" suffix (for digital television), though KWQC-TV remained as the station's official call sign.

On October 27, 2010, beginning with the 5:00 p.m. newscast, KWQC became the first television station in the Quad Cities market and the first station owned by Young Broadcasting to begin broadcasting its local newscasts in high definition. A high definition-ready news set was constructed for the newscasts (a "compact" news desk was temporarily placed in the newsroom during the construction phase so that only three on-air staffers could be seen at a given time). Logos, call signs and on-air graphics were changed as well to refer to its newscasts as KWQC-HD News. The station returned to their original KWQC-TV 6 News branding in 2012 after all the market's stations converted to high definition news operations.

On November 4, 2013, KWQC introduced brand new weather graphics. The whole Young Broadcasting Association had been working on the new graphics for over six months. The change brought a new banner to the top of the screen, entitled "KWQC Weather", not "First Alert", though "First Alert" is still the official name of the weather on KWQC. The radar, 7 Day Forecast, Current Temperatures, and Watches/Warnings were all given a new look. Some new features include being able to put pictures from Facebook right on the screen and being able to put LIVE video of the meteorologists right over the radar or other image. On December 12, 2013, KWQC took away the KWQC Weather logo and replaced it again with the First Alert logo.

Starting on September 6, 2014, KWQC introduced Quad Cities Today: Weekend Edition. It runs before NBC's Today Show at 6:00 a.m. on Saturdays and Sundays. A half-hour newscast follows at 8:30 a.m. Saturdays, and a 60-minute newscast airs at 8:00 a.m. Sundays. Meet the Press has been moved to 9:00 a.m. Sundays; and This Week in Agribusiness and U.S. Farm Report airs at 5:00 a.m. Saturdays and Sundays. KWQC had canceled its Saturday morning newscasts in 2008 due to financial struggles.

In July 2017, KWQC reinstated the longtime slogan "The Station that Cares for You" for KWQC special coverage of the Quad Cities Times Bix 7 Road Race. The slogan was used from the early 1990s until being phased out during the station's HD switch in 2010. The slogan was featured on news team T-shirts and was introduced in different promos and station commercials.

KWQC radio content
KWQC has news and weather updates broadcast for iHeartMedia's Quad Cities stations, among them KMXG, WLLR-FM, and its former sister station WOC (AM). The news updates are mostly heard in the morning, from Quad Cities Today anchor David Nelson and Morgan Ottier.  KMXG morning personalities McFadden & Evans also present the entertainment-themed "Showbiz Buzz" segment daily during KWQC-TV6 News at 4.

The audio of the Monday through Friday 5:00 p.m. News is rebroadcast on WOC 1420 at 5:30 p.m.

KWQC/KLJB partnership
On September 29, 2012, KWQC announced they would be partnering with Fox affiliate KLJB to produce a 9:00 p.m. newscast starting New Year's Eve and planned to expand the news staff to accommodate the move. The fate of this partnership was unknown with the June 2014 announcement that KLJB would be purchased by Marshall Broadcasting Group; competitor station WHBF from Citadel Communications was acquired by Nexstar Broadcasting Group, which universally operates Marshall Broadcasting Group stations through LMA and JSA agreements. On December 30, 2015, KWQC announced that its contract to produce KLJB's newscast had expired and that KLJB chose not to renew it. On December 31, 2015, WHBF took over production of KLJB's Fox 18 News at Nine and expanded the newscast to a full hour. Nearly 13 months earlier, the sale of KLJB to Marshall Broadcasting Group was completed, and Nexstar (which already owned WHBF and KGCW at the time) entered into its existing SSA with KLJB.

Ratings
KWQC has been the ratings leader in the Quad Cities for most of its history. It briefly lost the lead to WHBF in the mid-1970s but regained it in 1980, and its newscasts have been the highest-rated in the market ever since. According to the Des Moines Register in the November 2007 books, KWQC had the third highest-rated newscast among all stations in the top 100 media markets. In 2015, KWQC's newscasts remained number one in total viewers in every time slot. As of 2013–2014, Nielsen's DMA rank for the Quad Cities was 100.

Technical information

Subchannels
The station's digital signal is multiplexed:

Analog-to-digital conversion
After the shutdown of the KWQC-TV analog nightlight signal on June 26, 2009, the KWQC-TV call sign was legally transferred from the now-defunct analog channel 6 to the new digital channel 36 and the KWQC-DT call sign was officially discontinued. However, until mid-November 2009, the PSIP identifier continued to identify the main channel 6.1 as KWQC-DT. This finally changed before Thanksgiving Day in late November and the PSIP now identifies the main channel on 6.1 as the station's legal callsign, KWQC-TV.

KWQC-TV shut down its analog signal, over VHF channel 6, at 11:59 p.m. on June 12, 2009, the official date when full-power television stations in the United States transitioned from analog to digital broadcasts under federal mandate. The station shut off its pre-transition digital signal on channel 56 just after midnight on June 11–12. The station returned to the air on channel 36 around 1:00 a.m. on Friday, June 12. Through the use of PSIP, digital television receivers display the station's virtual channel as its former VHF analog channel 6. Most of the station's programming on the broadcast day of June 12, 2009, was actually broadcast both on analog channel 6 and the new digital channel 36, until 11:59 p.m. when KWQC used analog channel 6 to provide a Nightlight service to those remaining analog-only television viewers without a digital TV set or digital converter box for the two weeks following the digital transition.

KWQC's audio signal transmitted on a frequency of 87.76 MHz (+10 kHz shift) and was picked up on the lower end of the dial on most FM radios in most of the Quad Cities until 11:59 p.m. on June 12, 2009. As of 11:59 p.m. on June 12, 2009, the station's main programming is no longer heard on 87.75 MHz on FM radios.

Analog nightlight service
After June 12, KWQC continued using its analog channel 6 for Nightlighting for the next two weeks strictly for the purpose of informing the public about the need to switch over to digital. This included the details on purchasing and installation of DTV converter boxes and television sets, as well as how digital TV works. This service is known as "Nightlighting."  The national PSAs, produced by the National Association of Broadcasters, as well as a locally produced version by the station itself, was a joint effort between KWQC and the other broadcasters in the Quad Cities, including WHBF-TV, WQAD-TV, WQPT-TV, and KLJB, to inform the remaining unprepared TV viewers about the need to take action to continue receiving over- the-air television broadcasting.  The transmitter for KWQC analog channel 6 was shut down permanently at 11:59 p.m. on June 26, 2009. Being broadcast as it was in analog on VHF channel 6, the KWQC Nightlight Service was being heard on FM 87.76 MHz on FM radios during the two week Nightlight period instead of the KWQC main programming. Today, there is nothing but static on 87.7 FM on radios as well as snow on VHF channel 6 on analog TV sets.

Transmitter

It was built in 1982. In addition to the former KWQC analog signal, WHBF-TV and radio stations WOC (AM), and WLLR-FM, both former sister stations of KWQC-TV (as WOC-TV), as well as religious WDLM-FM, and NPR member station WVIK, transmit their signals from this site.

KWQC's digital transmission tower is located in Orion, Illinois. KWQC no longer transmits a signal from Bettendorf, as Orion is now its new permanent home for transmission facilities, as of June 12. KWQC's analog transmitter in Bettendorf was broadcasting the Quad City Market's "Nightlight" service around the clock until June 26, 2009. During the two-week "nightlight" period, none of the station's regular programming was broadcast on the analog signal. The aforementioned radio stations in the top paragraph of this section, as well as WHBF-TV, are continuing to transmit from Bettendorf. WHBF is the only Quad Cities television station to transmit from Bettendorf, while KWQC and the market's other stations are transmitting from Orion, with the exception of KGCW. This means many viewers in and around the Quad Cities market need either a rotor or two separate antennas to receive all their local TV stations.

July 2015 carriage dispute with Mediacom
On July 14, 2015, KWQC-TV and its digital subchannels were pulled from Mediacom cable systems in the Quad Cities region because of a carriage dispute over retransmission consent fees between Mediacom and KWQC's owner at the time, Media General. This carriage dispute was part of an ongoing disagreement nationwide between Mediacom and Media General, which saw Media General stations in 14 television markets in the United States pulled from Mediacom cable systems. Three Fox affiliates owned by Media General were lost to Mediacom subscribers in Hampton Roads, Virginia, Terre Haute, Indiana, and Topeka, Kansas, just before the start of the 2015 Major League Baseball All-Star Game. On July 30, 2015, Mediacom and Media General reached a new agreement, thereby restoring KWQC and its digital subchannels to Quad City area Mediacom subscribers.

References

Further reading
 
 
 KWQC On-Air accessed 2007-04-03

External links
 KWQC.com - Official KWQC TV-6 Website
 
 WOC's Captain Ernie's Cartoon Showboat website
 The Unofficial WOC Broadcast Center Website

Television stations in the Quad Cities
NBC network affiliates
Ion Television affiliates
Cozi TV affiliates
Heroes & Icons affiliates
Start TV affiliates
Circle (TV network) affiliates
Scripps News affiliates
Television channels and stations established in 1949
1949 establishments in Iowa
Davenport, Iowa
Gray Television